Michael Patrick Sweeney (born October 30, 1950) is an American Democratic Party politician who most recently served as mayor of Hayward, California, from 2006 to 2014. He served on the City Council starting in 1982, was reelected in 1986, and elected mayor for the first time in 1990.

Born in Oakland, California, Sweeney has a B.A. and M.A. in political science from California State University, Hayward. He was also the executive director of Spectrum Community Services, a nonprofit social service organization in Hayward. Sweeney previously served as representative for California's 18th State Assembly district as a Democrat, having been elected in 1994, and serving until 1998.

In August 2013, Sweeney announced he would not seek re-election in the 2014 California elections. His successor Barbara Halliday, took over as mayor in July 2014.

References

1950 births
Living people
Democratic Party members of the California State Assembly
California State University, East Bay alumni
California city council members
Government of Hayward, California
Mayors of places in California
People from Hayward, California
Politicians from Oakland, California